The Global Alliance of Affirming Apostolic Pentecostals (GAAAP) is an affirming, Oneness Pentecostal denomination, previously headquartered in Indianapolis, Indiana and later Thonotosassa, Florida. 

GAAAP was organized in 2007 by Rev. Kevin Konkle then of Indianapolis, Indiana and Rev. Robert Morgan of Tampa, Florida.  Rev. Morgan served as Founding Chairman and Rev. Konkle as Founding Vice-Chairman. 

GAAAP originally began as a ministerial fellowship, growing from only 2 founding ministers in the beginning of 2007 to 17 ministers by early 2008. By late fall 2010, the organization had grown to over 60 ministers in 19 States and 5 nations, becoming the largest of the known LGBT-affirming Pentecostal denomination in the world.

In April 2010, GAAAP assumed the 501c3 offered by the Apostolic Restoration Mission (ARM), formerly known as the National Gay Pentecostal Alliance (NGPA). NGPA had been the first LGBT-affirming Apostolic denomination, having formed in 1980 in Schenectady, New York.

The church is non-trinitarian in theology, holding to the belief that all the fullness of God resides bodily in Jesus, and teaches that repentance, water baptism by immersion in the name of Jesus Christ, and the Baptism of the Holy Ghost are essential elements of the Apostolic era church that must be retained in the church of God today. They also believe that speaking in tongues is the initial physical evidence of the baptism of the Holy Ghost.  

In November 2010, a number of its ministers left the organization due to philosophical differences on cultural and social issues irreconcilable with the leadership. Another organization was soon formed which in time also contended with issues and individuals who had previously left GAAAP with significant impact on their own development.

Ultimately, GAAAP was turned over to Rev. Joseph Parramore who brought the organization under his leadership and ministry where it remains today as New Journey Fellowship in Florida.

Affiliated, Endorsed and/or Cooperative Churches
Florida, Thonotossasa - Under His Wings Ministries - Pastor Robert Morgan (GAAAP)

See also

 Gay Apostolic Pentecostals
 Oneness Pentecostals

References

External links
Official website of Global Alliance of Affirming Apostolic Pentecostals

LGBT churches in the United States
Oneness Pentecostal denominations